The Juno Awards of 1977, representing Canadian music industry achievements of the previous year, were awarded on 16 March 1977 in Toronto at a ceremony hosted by David Steinberg at the Royal York Hotel. The ceremonies were broadcast on a 2-hour CBC Television special. Oddly, a US band , Heart, won a Juno for best Canadian band 

Classical and jazz categories were introduced this year.

Nominees and winners

Nominated and winning albums

Best Selling Album
Winner: Neiges, André Gagnon

Best Album Graphics
Winner:  Michael Bownes], Ian Tamblyn by Ian Tamblyn

Best Classical Album of the Year
Winner: Beethoven - Vols. 1,2,&3, Anton Kuerti

Other nominees:
 Franck and Ravel, Hidetaro Suzuki & Zeyda Ruga-Suzuki
 Franz Schubert & Johannes Brahms, Gisela Depkat
 Liona, Liona Boyd
 Plays J.S. Bach, Pierre Grandmaison

Best Selling International Album
Winner: Frampton Comes Alive, Peter Frampton

Best Jazz Album
Winner: The Atlantic Suite, Phil Nimmons - Nimmons 'N Nine Plus SixJingle Man — Moe KoffmanTravelin' On — Oscar PetersonThe Jazz Album — Rob McConnell and the Boss BrassNowhere But Here'' — Joel Shulman

Nominated and winning releases

Best Selling Single
Winner: "Roxy Roller", Sweeney Todd
André Gagnon, "Wow"
Patsy Gallant, "From New York to L.A."
THP Orchestra, "Theme from S.W.A.T."

Best Selling International Single
Winner: "I Love to Love", Tina Charles

References

External links
Juno Awards site

1977
1977 music awards
1977 in Canadian music